Carcoar Dam is a minor ungated concrete double parabolic arch dam with an uncontrolled overflow spillway across the Belubula River upstream of Carcoar in the central west region of New South Wales, Australia. The dam's purpose includes irrigation, water supply, and water conservation.

Location and features
Water from the dam is released directly into the Belubula River which is used by irrigators downstream of the dam, and for stock and domestic requirements along the Belubula River.

The dam uses a free-flowing spillway which is capable of discharging .

The dam is unusual in that its wall is not only curved from side-to-side but also from top to bottom.

The dam is popular for water skiing, swimming, fishing windsurfing and sailing.  Camping, picnic and barbecue facilities are available. Murray Cod, Golden Perch, Silver Perch and Rainbow Trout are all stocked fish in Carcoar Dam with Redfin present.

Carcoar wetland
In the early 1990s, the NSW Government assisted to establish wetlands at Carcoar Dam in an effort to control blue-green algae which had made the dam unusable for recreation and made the water discharged from the dam unusable, even for domestic animals. The purpose of the wetland was to act as a nutrient sink which could capture nutrients prior to them entering the reservoir.

Gallery

See also

 List of dams and reservoirs in New South Wales

References

External links
 

Dams in New South Wales
Dams completed in 1970
Central West (New South Wales)
Arch dams